Flynn James Robinson (April 28, 1941 – May 23, 2013) was an American professional basketball player.

Early life
Flynn was born April 28, 1941, from the union of Sam Hopkins and Dorothy Mae Robinson.  Later Flynn's mother married Johnnie Hodge Sr., Flynn's step-father.  A native of Murphysboro, Illinois, Robinson later moved to Kinloch, Missouri (St. Louis area), where he attended Dunbar Elementary School thru the 4th Grade as Flynn Hodge. Afterwards Flynn lived in Elgin, Illinois (Chicago area) and graduated in 1959 from Elgin High School. Flynn averaged 31 points per game during both his Junior and Senior years and in 1959 led Elgin to their Regional and Conference Championships.

College career 
Robinson attended Southern Illinois University in September 1959 for one semester and was on the basketball team. Later he transferred to and attended Casper College in Casper, Wyoming, before transferring to the University of Wyoming in Laramie, Wyoming.  A  6'1" guard at Wyoming, Robinson was a three-time first-team All-Western Athletic Conference honoree. He averaged 26.2 points per game as a sophomore, 25.6 points as a junior and 27 points as a senior and was the 6th leading scorer in the nation. His 2,049 points place him third on Wyoming's all-time scoring list, and in 2005 he was named to the school's All-Century team.

NBA career 
Robinson played seven seasons (1966–1973) in the National Basketball Association and one season (1973–1974) in the later merged American Basketball Association. He averaged 14.5 points per game and 3.1 assists per game during his NBA/ABA career.

The 15th pick in the 1965 NBA draft, Robinson made his NBA debut with the Cincinnati Royals in 1966.

Later, Robinson played for the Chicago Bulls and Milwaukee Bucks.  The Bucks' play-by-play radio announcer, Eddie Doucette, called Flynn the "Electric Eye".

In the 1969–70 season with Milwaukee, Robinson averaged a career high 21.8 points per game and was selected to the 1970 NBA All-Star Game, the only All-Star game he would play in. He also led the NBA in free throw percentage that season.

Traded to Los Angeles in 1971 from the Cincinnati Royals, Robinson was a reserve guard behind Jerry West and Gail Goodrich for the Los Angeles Lakers team that won a league-record 33 consecutive games and later won an NBA championship with the team in 1972, playing on what has been considered one of the NBA's Top Ten Teams of all time. When he joined the Lakers, their radio broadcaster, Chick Hearn, called Flynn "Instant Points".

Legacy 
In 1992, Robinson returned to Los Angeles where he and his Laker teammates, including legends Wilt Chamberlain, Elgin Baylor, and Jerry West, were honored at the 20th Year Celebration of the 1972 NBA Champion Los Angeles Lakers.
 
In January 2005, Robinson was named to Wyoming's All-Century Team.

In 2012, while living in the Los Angeles area, Robinson again was honored with his surviving teammates at the 40th Year Celebration of the 1972 NBA Champion Lakers, who continue to hold the Historic 33-Games Win Streak, a long-standing pro sports record. The Lakers presented Flynn and each surviving team member with a huge expensive Diamond Cluster Ring.

In his 50s and 60s, Flynn played basketball at the Senior Olympics level.

Death 
Robinson died on May 23, 2013, in Los Angeles, of multiple myeloma. He was 72 and was survived by his wife, Nancy Pitts-Robinson, four brothers and two sisters. A notable surviving brother is Air Force Captain Johnnie Hodge Jr., who was one of our country's 1979 "Outstanding Young Men of America".[5]

NBA/ABA career statistics

Regular season

Playoffs

References

External links
Career statistics at https://www.basketball-reference.com
 "Flynn Robinson's life in basketball didn't end at 33", by Jerry Crowe, Los Angeles Times, March 24, 2008

1941 births
2013 deaths
African-American basketball players
Amateur Athletic Union men's basketball players
American men's basketball players
Baltimore Bullets (1963–1973) players
Basketball players from Illinois
Deaths from cancer in California
Chicago Bulls players
Cincinnati Royals draft picks
Cincinnati Royals players
Deaths from multiple myeloma
Los Angeles Lakers players
Milwaukee Bucks players
National Basketball Association All-Stars
Point guards
San Diego Conquistadors players
Sportspeople from Elgin, Illinois
Wyoming Cowboys basketball players
20th-century African-American sportspeople
21st-century African-American people